Johann Matthäus Meyfart, also Johann Matthaeus Meyfahrt, Mayfart (9 November 1590 – 26 January 1642) was a German Lutheran theologist, educator, academic teacher, hymn writer and minister. He was an opponent fighter of witch trials.

Career 
Meyfart was born in Jena, the son of a minister, and studied at the University of Jena from 1608, first the liberal arts graduating in 1603, then theology, continued at the University of Wittenberg from 1614. He taught from 1617 at the Gymnasium in Coburg, serving as its Rektor from 1623.

In 1633 Meyfart was appointed professor of theology at the University of Erfurt. He was the Rektor of the university from 1634 to 1636. During the last years of his life he served as a minister at the Predigerkirche, where he is buried.

Meyfart is known as the author of hymns such as "“ (Evangelisches Gesangbuch EG. 150), written in 1626. He wrote from 1629 to 1632 , a call against witch trials, published in 1635.

Selected works 
  Erfurt 1635.
  ed. Erich Trunz, Tübingen 1977. (Deutsche Neudrucke, Reihe Barock 25; new edition)
 , . ed. Erich Trunz, Tübingen 1979. (Deutsche Neudrucke, Reihe Barock 26, first Coburg 1626)
 ,  Coburg 1626.
  1633.
  Schleusingen 1636.
  three volumes, Leipzig 1628, 1633, 1637.

Recognition 
 His day in the Evangelischer Namenkalender (Lutheran Calendar of Saints) is 26 January.

Literature 
 C. Hallier:  ed. . Neumünster 1982. (Kieler Studien 15)
 Traudl Kleefeld: . In Hartmut Hegeler: Unterrichtsmaterialien Hexenverfolgungen. Unna 2005, p. 68f
 Erich Trunz:  Munich 1987
 Gerhard Dünnhaupt: Johann Matthäus Meyfart (1590–1642). In: Personalbibliographien zu den Drucken des Barock. Band 4, Hiersemann, Stuttgart 1991, . S. 2721–2750. 
 Walther Killy (ed.): Literaturlexikon. Autoren und Werke deutscher Sprache. (15 vol). Bertelsmann-Lexikon-Verlag, Gütersloh/München 1988–1991. (CD-ROM: Berlin 1998)

External links 
 
 
 Johann Matthäus Meyfart: Christliche Erinnerung / An Gewaltige Regenten
 Schmid, Markus: Eine kritische Stimme zur Hexenverfolgung: Johannes Matthäus Meyfarts Christliche Erinnerung von 1635, in: Skriptum 2 (2012), No. 2, URN: urn:nbn:de:0289-2012110259 Open-Access verfügbarer Artikel mit Schwerpunkt auf der Entstehung und Bedeutung der Christlichen Erinnerung.

References 

German Lutheran theologians
German Lutheran hymnwriters
1590 births
1642 deaths
16th-century Lutheran theologians
17th-century Lutheran theologians